Elizabeth Lefort  D. Litt. (1914–2005) was a Canadian tapestry artist, known for replicating photographs including portraits.

Biography
Elizabeth Lefort was born in 1914 in Point Cross, Nova Scotia. In 1926 at the age of  12 she left school to begin her career and bring in needed income for her family. Lefort learned the craft of rug hooking from her mother. This craft has strong roots in Cape Breton.

Lefort showed particular proficiency and around 1940 began following her own vision of design, by meticulously copying a postcard she received from her brother in England. Not only was the rug an artistic success, it sold for a higher price than the more traditional designs. To achieve the desired effect, Lefort dyed the wool she used to the specific colors she wanted.

Lefort continued her work, championed by owner of a local crafts store, Kenneth Hansford, and she became the artist-in-residence at the Paul Pix Boutique in Margaree Harbour, Nova Scotia. Lefort and Hansford eventually married.

In 1957 Lefort completed a tapestry portrait of U.S. President Eisenhower which was presented to the White House.

Lefort continued producing portraits and also often used religious subjects, including a tapestry reproduction of da Vinci's Last Supper.

In 1975 she received an honorary Docteur ès lettres from the Université de Moncton. In 1987 she was appointed a member of the Order of Canada.

Lafort died in 2005 in Chéticamp, Nova Scotia.

References

1914 births
2005 deaths
20th-century Canadian women artists
20th-century Canadian painters
Canadian women painters
Artists from Nova Scotia
Tapestry artists
Members of the Order of Canada